Hemerocallis yezoensis is a species of plant in the genus Hemerocallis, native to eastern Hokkaido and the southernmost extremities of the Kuril Islands.

Description 
Hemerocallis yezoensis is a perennial species of plant with a cespitose basal rosette of linear leaves and multiple inflorescences consisting of large, yellow flowers on a narrowly branching stem. It grows to a height of 0.75 m (30 inches).

Range 
Hemerocallis yezoensis has been reported in eastern Hokkaido and the southern point of Kunashir Island of the Kuril Island chain.

Habitat 
Hemerocallis yezoensis grows in fields and other open areas in full sun. It blooms in July through August.

Etymology 
The specific epithet "yezoensis" is derived from the word "Ezo", a historical term used to describe the Japanese Islands north of Honshu.

References 

yezoensis
Flora of Japan